The 23rd Rhythmic Gymnastics European Championships were held in Baku, Azerbaijan from 29 June to 1 July 2007.

Medal winners

Results

Senior

Team

Rope

Hoop

Clubs

Ribbon

Junior

Group 10 clubs

References

FIG official site
 

Rhythmic Gymnastics European Championships
Rhythmic Gymnastics European Championships
Sports competitions in Baku
International gymnastics competitions hosted by Azerbaijan
Rhythmic Gymnastics European Championships